Joseph William Zalusky (March 30, 1881 – November 7, 1970) was a minor league baseball player and an American football player and coach. He served as the head football coach at Penn College—now known as William Penn University—in Oskaloosa, Iowa from 1904 to 1910, compiling a record of 19–8–5. As a college football player at Knox College in Galesburg, Illinois, he was part of a 1902 squad that beat Northwestern, Kansas, and Notre Dame in three consecutive games.

References

External links

1881 births
1970 deaths
American football halfbacks
Fort Dodge Gypsum Eaters players
Knox Prairie Fire football players
Oskaloosa Quakers players
Rock Island Islanders players
William Penn Statesmen athletic directors
William Penn Statesmen baseball coaches
William Penn Statesmen football coaches
Sportspeople from Minneapolis
Players of American football from Minneapolis
Sports coaches from Minneapolis